The 2014 Challenger ATP de Salinas Diario Expreso was a professional tennis tournament played on clay courts. It was the 19th edition of the tournament which was part of the 2014 ATP Challenger Tour. It took place in Salinas, Ecuador between February 24 and March 2, 2014.

Singles main-draw entrants

Seeds

 Rankings are as of February 17, 2014.

Other entrants
The following players received wildcards into the singles main draw:
  Julio César Campozano
  Joseph Correa
  Giovanni Lapentti
  Jesse Witten

The following players gained entry into the singles main draw as an alternate:
  Maximiliano Estévez

The following players received entry from the qualifying draw:
  Bastian Malla
  Christian Garín
  Guillermo Durán
  Eduardo Struvay

Champions

Singles

 Víctor Estrella def.  Andrea Collarini, 6–3, 6–4

Doubles

  Roberto Maytín /  Fernando Romboli def.  Hugo Dellien /  Eduardo Schwank, 6–3, 6–4

References

External links 
 Official website

Challenger ATP de Salinas Diario Expreso
Challenger ATP de Salinas Diario Expreso

es:Challenger de Salinas
it:Challenger Salinas 2014